Two-time defending champion Novak Djokovic defeated Matteo Berrettini in the final, 6–7(4–7), 6–4, 6–4, 6–3 to win the gentlemen's singles tennis title at the 2021 Wimbledon Championships.
It was his sixth Wimbledon title and 20th major title overall, tying Roger Federer and Rafael Nadal's all-time record total of men's singles titles.

Djokovic became the first man to win the Australian Open, French Open and Wimbledon titles in the same calendar year since Rod Laver in 1969 and the first to achieve the Surface Slam (winning majors on three different surfaces in a calendar year) since Nadal in 2010. He also became the fifth man in the Open Era to win the Channel Slam (French Open/Wimbledon double).

Djokovic and Daniil Medvedev were in contention for the ATP No. 1 singles ranking; Djokovic retained the top ranking when Medvedev lost in the fourth round.

This event marked the final professional singles appearance of 20-time major champion and former world No. 1 Roger Federer; he lost in the quarterfinals to Hubert Hurkacz. Federer became the oldest man to reach the Wimbledon quarterfinals in the Open Era, and the oldest man to reach a major quarterfinal since Ken Rosewall in 1977. By winning his fourth-round match he completed 105 wins at Wimbledon. The 18 quarterfinals and 119 matches he has contested at Wimbledon are both tournament records. In the quarterfinals, Federer lost in straight sets at Wimbledon for the first time since 2002.

Berrettini became the first Italian man to reach a major final since Adriano Panatta at the 1976 French Open and the first to do so at Wimbledon. Zhang Zhizhen became the first Chinese man to qualify for the Wimbledon main draw in the Open Era. Márton Fucsovics became the first Hungarian to reach a men's singles major quarterfinal since Balázs Taróczy at the 1981 French Open and the first to do so at Wimbledon since József Asbóth in 1948. It was the first time since 2017 that two-time champion Andy Murray participated and the first time since 2005 that he entered via a wildcard. For the first time since 2002, the grass court seeding formula was abandoned and the standard ranking system based on the ATP rankings was permanently adopted, like at the other three majors.

Seeds

Draw

Finals

Top half

Section 1

Section 2

Section 3

Section 4

Bottom half

Section 5

Section 6

Section 7

Section 8

Seeded players
The following are the seeded players. Seedings are based on ATP rankings as of 21 June 2021. Rankings and points are as before 28 June 2021. Players will count either their 2021 points or 50% of their 2019 points, whichever is greater.

† The player did not qualify for the tournament in 2019. Accordingly, points defending from the ATP Challenger Tour are deducted instead.
^ Because the 2021 tournament was non-mandatory, the player substituted his 19th best result in place of the points won in this tournament.

Withdrawn players
The following players would have been seeded, but withdrew before the tournament began. Only half of their defending points are deducted.

^ Because the 2021 tournament was non-mandatory, the player substituted his 19th best result in place of the points won in this tournament.

Other entry information

Wild card entries
The following players were awarded wild cards into the main draw.

Qualifiers

Lucky losers

Protected ranking

Withdrawals

See also
2021 Wimbledon Championships – Day-by-day summaries

Explanatory notes

References

External links
 Men's singles draw
 The Championships 2021 – Gentlemen's Singles

Men's Singles
Wimbledon Championships – Men's Singles
2021